Yeliz Başa (born Yeliz Askan on August 13, 1987 in Beykoz, Istanbul, Turkey) is a Turkish female volleyball player, who won the gold medal at the 2014 Women's European Volleyball League playing with the Turkey women's national volleyball team.

Career
Yeliz Başa began her sports career at the age of 14 in the youth team of Beykoz Spor in her hometown. She transferred to Beşiktaş one year later. After playing for the youth team between 2002 and 2004, and for the juniors team from 2004 tp 2006, she entered the senior team, where she was part of until 2012.

Her successful performance in 2011–12 season led her to the membership in the Turkey women's national volleyball team.

In the 2012–13 season, she transferred to NEC Red Rockets in Japan after signing a one-year contract.  She became so the first ever Turkish women's volleyball player in Japan. She enjoyed champion title in the Japan's V.League after winning 23 of the 28 matches. Named MVP in many games, she contributed to her team's champion title.

The next season, she signed a contract for one year with Hyundai Hillstate in South Korea. She also became the first ever Turkish volleyball player in South Korea.

She returned to Japanese NEC Red Rockets team and played 2014-2016 seasons.
In the summer of 2016, she signed with the Czech Republic's Agel Prostejov team and was transferred to Halbank, Turkey in January 2017.

Personal life
Yeliz Başa is married to Onur Başa in 2013.

Clubs
  Beşiktaş (2002–12)
  NEC Red Rockets (2012–13)
  Hyundai Hillstate (2013–14)
  NEC Red Rockets (2014–2016)
  Agel Prostejov (2016–17)
  Halkbank Ankara (2017–18)
  Gresik Petrokimia (2018)
  Jakarta PGN Popsivo (2018–19)
  Nakhon Ratchasima The Mall (2019)
  Đức Giang Hà Nội (2019-loan)
  Partizani Tirane (2019–20)
  Llaneras de Toa Baja (2020)
  Nakhon Ratchasima The Mall (2020–21)
  Bandung Bank BJB Tandamata (2022)
  Creamline Cool Smashers (2022)

Awards

Individuals
 2009 Balkan Cup Best Striker with Beşiktaş
 2019 Thai–Denmark Super League "Best Outside Hitter"
 2020-21 Thailand League "Best Opposite Spike"

Club
 2018–19 Thailand League -  Champion, with Nakhon Ratchasima
 2019 Thai–Denmark Super League -  Runner-Up, with Nakhon Ratchasima
 2020-21 Thailand League  -  Runner-Up, with Nakhon Ratchasima
 2022 Premier Volleyball League Reinforced Conference -  Third place, with Creamline Cool Smashers

National team

Awards
 2014 European League -

See also
 Turkish women in sports

References

External links
 

1987 births
People from Beykoz
Volleyball players from Istanbul
Turkish women's volleyball players
Beşiktaş volleyballers
Turkish expatriate volleyball players
Turkish expatriate sportspeople in Japan
Turkish expatriate sportspeople in South Korea
Living people